Carstens Shoal is an almost circular shoal (least depth ) lying just north of East Budd Island, and just west of Moller Bank, in Holme Bay, Mac. Robertson Land. It was charted in February 1961 by d'A.T. Gale, hydrographic surveyor with the Australian National Antarctic Research Expeditions (Thala Dan), and named by the Antarctic Names Committee of Australia for D.R. Carstens, surveyor at Mawson Station in 1962, who assisted the hydrographic survey in 1961.

References
 

Barrier islands of Antarctica
Islands of Mac. Robertson Land